The 2019–20 season was Pafos's 6th year in existence, and third season in the Cypriot First Division.

Season review

On 1 July, Pafos announced the signings of Artur Rudko from Dynamo Kyiv, Mickaël Panos from Saint-Étienne and Giorgos Valerianos from Aris Thessaloniki.

On 3 July, Brazilian defender, Jander, was sold to Red Star Belgrade for a club-record fee.

On 6 July, Pafos signed Nigerian International midfielder Sunny, who'd last played for Real Salt Lake, with Alex Konstantinou joining from Olympiakos Nicosia on 10 July, and Panagiotis Zachariou leaving the club by mutual agreement to join Olympiakos Nicosia on 11 July 2019.

On 16 July, Pafos sold Belgium midfielder to KAS Eupen for an undisclosed fee, and new club-record fee.

On 31 July, Angolan forward, Vá joined Pafos from Petro de Luanda.

In August, Pafos signed Nahir Besara from Al-Fayha, Paulus Arajuuri from Brøndby, and the season-long loan signing of Reinis Reinholds from Pisa.

On 1 September Cy Goddard joined on a season-long loan deal from Benevento, with Kevin Lafrance joining the next day from APOEL on a similar deal.

On 5 September Gerasimos Fylaktou returned to Pafos from Ermis Aradippou, having previously played for the club on loan during the 2017–18 season.

On 6 September, Pafos signed former Crystal Palace winger Bakary Sako and former Huddersfield Town midfielder Danny Williams on free-transfers, with Jerson Cabral joining the following day on a free-transfer having last played for Levski Sofia.

On 6 November, Željko Kopić left his role as head coach of Pafos, with sporting director Jeremy Steele being placed in temporary charge. On 13 December, Cameron Toshack was announced as Pafos' new permanent head coach.

In January, Lulinha left Pafos after his contract was terminated by mutual agreement, whilst Deniss Rakels and Zdeněk Folprecht returned to the club following loan stints away during the first half of the season.

On 24 January, Brayan Angulo signed permanently for Pafos from Independiente Medellín having previously played for the club during the 2018–19 season.

On 30 January, Pafos signed Onni Valakari from Tromsø for an undisclosed fee.

On 15 May, the Cyta Championship was abandoned due to COVID-19 pandemic.

Transfers

In

Loans in

Out

Loans out

Released

Squad

Out on loan

Left club during season

Friendlies

Competitions

Overview

Cyta Championship

Regular season

League table

Results summary

Results by results

Results

Relegation round

League table

Results summary

Results by results

Results

Cypriot Cup

Squad statistics

Appearances and goals

|-
|colspan="14"|Players away on loan:

|-
|colspan="14"|Players who appeared for Pafos but left during the season:

|}

Goal scorers

Clean sheets

Disciplinary record

References

Pafos FC seasons
Pafos FC season